The Doctor's Secret (Swedish: Doktorns hemlighet) is a 1930 drama film directed by John W. Brunius and starring Ivan Hedqvist,  Pauline Brunius and Olof Sandborg. It was produced and distributed by the Swedish subsidiary of Paramount Pictures at the company's Joinville Studios. It was one of a large number of multiple-language versions shot at Joinville during the early years of the sound era. It is a Swedish-language remake of the Hollywood film The Doctor's Secret, based on the play Half an Hour by J.M. Barrie.  It is now considered to be a lost film.

Synopsis
Lillian Gardner is unhappily married to a wealthy businessman. She meets another man and falls in love, planning to elope with him, but he is killed in a car accident.

Cast
 Ivan Hedqvist as 	Doctor Bolton
 Pauline Brunius as	Lady Lillian Gardner
 Olof Sandborg as 	Richard Gardner
 Hugo Björne as 	Hugo Paton
 Erik Berglund as Mr. Redding
 Märta Ekström as Mrs. Redding
 Anne-Marie Brunius as Annie
 Ragna Broo-Juter as 	Mary

References

Bibliography 
 Goble, Alan. The Complete Index to Literary Sources in Film. Walter de Gruyter, 1999.
 Sadoul, Georges. Dictionary of Film Makers. University of California Press, 1972.

External links 
 

1930 films
American drama films
Swedish drama films
1930 drama films
1930s Swedish-language films
Films directed by John W. Brunius
Swedish black-and-white films
Swedish films based on plays
Films shot at Joinville Studios
Paramount Pictures films
Films set in London
Films based on works by J. M. Barrie
1930s American films
1930s Swedish films